Besarta Leci (born 14 October 1993) is a Kosovan footballer who plays as a goalkeeper for the German club VfL Sindelfingen and the Kosovo national team.

Career
Leci has been capped for the Kosovo national team, appearing for the team during the UEFA Women's Euro 2021 qualifying cycle.

See also
List of Kosovo women's international footballers

References

External links
 
 
 

1993 births
Living people
Kosovan women's footballers
Kosovo women's international footballers
Women's association football goalkeepers